Tanla Platforms Limited, previously known as Tanla Solutions Ltd, is a cloud communications company based in Hyderabad, India. The company provides value-added services in the cloud communications space. Tanla has offices in ten locations including Singapore, London, Colombo, Dubai, etc. The company operates with a team of more than 500 and is listed in BSE and NSE in India. The company is India's largest Communications Platform as a Service (CPaaS) company.

History 
Tanla started as a small group of mobile messaging experts, with base in Hyderabad. Dasari Uday Kumar Reddy is the Founder of Tanla Platforms Limited. He is the Chairman and CEO  of the Company. He holds an MBA degree from Manchester Business School in the UK.

Tanla is a public limited company listed on leading Indian stock exchanges.

Services 
Tanla Platforms Limited initially started as a Bulk SMS provider in Hyderabad catering to SME. As the team grew, the company evolved into a Cloud communication provider with services and products with aggregators and Telcos across the globe.

Acquisitions

Tanla Platforms Limited acquired Finland based mobile payments company OpenBit Oy (now called Tanla Oy) in June 2009. In June 2008, Tanla picked up 85 percent in the company, followed by an acquisition of 5 percent in June 2009.

Tanla Platforms Limited signed a definitive share purchase agreement on August 21, 2018, to acquire 100% of Karix Mobile (formerly known as mGage India) and its wholly owned subsidiary, Unicel from GSO Capital partners, a Blackstone Company, at an enterprise value of 340 Crore. The closure of this acquisition was announced on April 11, 2019.

References

External links 
 
 
 
 
 
 LinkedIn profile
 

1999 establishments in Andhra Pradesh
Telecommunications companies of India
Companies based in Hyderabad, India
Telecommunications companies established in 1999